Odostomia era is a species of sea snail, a marine gastropod mollusc in the family Pyramidellidae, the pyrams and their allies.

Distribution
This species occurs in the Pacific Ocean off Magdalena Bay, Baja California.

References

External links
 To USNM Invertebrate Zoology Mollusca Collection
 To World Register of Marine Species

era
Gastropods described in 1927